Maróc is a village located in Zala County in Western Hungary.

References

Populated places in Zala County